Richard Benjamin (Ricky) Rountree (b 1952) was the Church of Ireland Archdeacon of Glendalough from 2009 until 2018.

Rountree was educated at the National University of Ireland and the Church of Ireland Theological College; and ordained in 1977. After curacies at Orangefield and Dublin he was the incumbent in Dalkey from 1983 until 1997. He has been at Powerscourt since 1997; and Treasurer of Christ Church Cathedral, Dublin from 2004.

References

1952 births
Archdeacons of Glendalough
Alumni of the National University of Ireland
Alumni of the Church of Ireland Theological Institute
Living people